Patrick Loubatière is a French author and journalist, stage director and teacher. He is also a chess coach, and a former national champion.

Career

Plays 
He wrote and directed two French stage pieces for Alison Arngrim: Confessions d’une Garce de la Prairie (2006+) and La malle aux trésors de Nellie Oleson (2012+). These comedic, interactive shows are based on the cult series Little House on the Prairie, where Alison Arngrim played the role of Nellie Oleson. Patrick Loubatière joins Arngrim on the stage as a comedy duo. Both shows got rave reviews in the French media. In August 2016, a book was published to celebrate the 10th anniversary of the shows.

Journalist
He is also a prolific television and music journalist. Writer for the Belgian weekly Télépro and for several French magazines, he has published interviews with most of the actors on the series Lost, NCIS, The Mentalist, Desperate Housewives, Criminal Minds, Revenge, CSI: Crime Scene Investigation, etc. He has also interviewed such TV legends as Larry Hagman, Robert Conrad, Lee Majors, David McCallum, Stefanie Powers, Paul Michael Glaser, Patrick Duffy, Barbara Bain, etc.

Loubatière's book Little House on the Prairie from A to Z accompanies the complete series on DVD. He also interviewed the actors on the bonus segments, plus created the trivia quizzes.

Since 2011, he has written and published a tribute series of books/magazines called Forever. Each number is an exhaustive review of a favorite artist's career, including exclusive interviews with persons close to the subject, and exclusive pictures. Among the actors and singers honored in these are Michael Landon, Autumn Reeser, Antonio Fargas, German pop star Sandra, Karen Grassle, etc. Only two of them were published in English: Prairie Memories and Autumn Reeser - No Ordinary Girl.

Chess
Loubatière teaches Chess in high school and established this program as a degree option. A former national Chess champion himself at age 14, he no longer competes but has coached his teams to victory in over 20 French and European title competitions.

Other activities
Patrick Loubatière teaches French literature at a Montpellier high school, in the south of France.

He is an activist promoting youth health programs, including anti-smoking and child abuse campaigns.

He also organized conferences between hundreds of high school students, French authors and comedians: Jean d'Ormesson, Patrick Bruel, Íngrid Betancourt, Amélie Nothomb, Bernard Werber, and so on.

References

Living people
French directors
French journalists
French male non-fiction writers
Year of birth missing (living people)
Place of birth missing (living people)